An Giang Football Club, simply known as An Giang, is a professional football club, based in An Giang Province, Vietnam. The team is currently participating in the Vietnam National Championship Division Three.

Honours

National competitions
League
V.League 1:
 Third place :     1987–88
V.League 2:
 Third place :     2007

Current squad
As of 4 January 2022

Kit suppliers and shirt sponsors

Performance in AFC competitions
 Asian Cup Winners' Cup: 1 appearances
1995–96: First Round

References

External links

Football clubs in Vietnam
1997 establishments in Vietnam
Association football clubs established in 1997
Association football clubs disestablished in 2014
2014 disestablishments in Vietnam